Fig.5 is the fifth studio album by the American experimental rock band Jackie-O Motherfucker. Released originally in the year 2000 on Road Cone, and later reissued by ATP Recordings in 2005. The album is highly improvisational and, features among its track list free-jazz-inspired reworkings of traditional songs such as "Amazing Grace". In addition to the folk sound, the album incorporates elements of drone, post rock and gospel. The album was critically acclaimed, especially on its reissue.

Background 
The album is often noted for its interpretation of Americana. "Amazing Grace" is an extremely improvisational take on the Christian hymn of the same name. "Go Down, Old Hannah" is based on a traditional prison work song, also notably covered by blues singer Lead Belly. The songs "Native Einstein" and "Madame Curie" take their names from famous physicists. Founding member of the band Tom Greenwood has mentioned in interviews that the band played together formatively in a rented house on Michigan Ave.

Reception 
The album has received high critical acclaim. Upon its initial release, Brent S Sirota of Pitchfork Media gave the album a 9.2, stating that it "presents a dim and unsettling archaeology of American music" and calling it "the first unapologetically brilliant piece of experimental music I've heard this year." Pitchfork later placed it at number 20 on their "Top 20 albums of 2000 List". Charlie Wilmouth of Allmusic gave the album 4 and a half stars and compared it favourably to the works of Captain Beefheart and The Dirty Three.
Upon its reissue Drowned in Sound gave the album a 9 out of 10 with reviewer J.R. Moore calling their version of "Amazing Grace" "the greatest version of that song ever recorded."
Mike Pace of Pop Matters offered a much less enthusiastic review, giving the album a 6 out of 10, saying "Fig.5 is pretentious, at times unlistenable, but often strangely intriguing". Tiny Mix Tapes gave the album a 3 out of 5 as the band can "craft instrumental songs that are interesting, but not interesting enough to make an entire album consisting of their weird, sometimes intolerable noodling."

Track listing

Personnel 
Personnel as listed in the 2005 reissue:
Tom Greenwood – guitar, harmonica, percussion, alto sax, vocals, banjo
Jessie Carrot – drums, percussion, bells
Jef Brown – guitar, oboe, tenor sax, toy piano, clarinet, percussion, upright bass
John Flemming – alto sax
Andy Cvar – electronics, lap steel, shells, shaker, organ
Barry Hampton – upright bass, fender bass, flute, percussion
Patrick Alveres – percussion, flute
Nester Bucket – alto sax, tenor sax
Sha Sha Beautyrest – violin, vocals
Ryan Noel – tenor sax, lap steel, upright bass, vocals
Honey Owens – guitar, vocals, snare, percussion
Brian Foote – electric bass, electronics
The Amalgamated Everlasting Union Chorus Local #824 – vocals on track 4

References 

2000 albums
Post-rock albums by American artists
Jazz albums by American artists
ATP Recordings albums
Fire Records (UK) albums